Atebaya is the first studio album by French rapper Joke. It was released on June 2, 2014, by Def Jam France. The album features guest appearances by Jhene Aiko, Pusha T, Dosseh, Seth Gueko, Rim'K, Bip's and Titan.

Track listing

2014 debut albums
Joke (rapper) albums